Goregaon (Marathi pronunciation: [ɡoːɾeɡaːʋ], formerly Goregaumn,  station code: GMN) is a railway station on the Western line and Harbour line of the Mumbai Suburban Railway network. It serves the suburb of Goregaon. As a general rule, Virar-bound fast trains skip Goregaon, while Borivali-bound fast trains halt here (although there are exceptions) but being in middle between Andheri and Borivali ; it hosts as an important halt for termination and origination of Churchgate and Mumbai CSMT/ Panvel bound services with access to various areas of Dindoshi, Oshiwara, Film City and outlining areas from Malad and Jogeshwari.

What distinguishes Goregaon from Jogeshwari is the four Churchgate-bound fast 'Goregaon Locals' which depart (from platform number 7) at an interval of approximately 30 minutes during the morning rush-hour and Goregaon consists of numerous Churchgate-bound slow "Goregaon locals" throughout the day which originate and terminate at Goregaon. Although, Goregaon has not been granted a permanent halt for all fast bound locals as compared to Andheri and Borivali, this station is an important hub for a large number of Western and Harbour line locals which terminate and originate from there. Harbour line which previously ran from Mumbai CSMT till Andheri was extended till Goregaon and services commenced on March 29, 2018. It is supposed to be extended to Borivali in near future.

Station Upgrades
A 103 crore remodel for Andheri, Jogeshwari, and Goregaon stations was completed in 2014. This remodelling included creation of additional two platforms on the west side of existing platform number 3 (then platform 1) to accommodate Harbour line trains. It also included building an elevated deck above the new platforms with ticketing facilities, and connections to central FOB and skywalk leading to both east and west sides of the station.

Layout
The station currently has five foot-over-bridges (FOBs) and 7 platforms. This station has an additional loop line which serves as Platform 7 as it is useful not only during morning hours for Goregaon-Churchgate bound fast locals during peak hours but also as an extra line during emergency conditions for trains.The outer rail tracks of this station has diversion points for changing of tracks for trains which are the only diversion points present between Andheri railway station and Borivali railway station and extra loop rail tracks for out of service local trains to halt sideways when they are not operational. The upper deck of the station serves as a facility for ticket counters and ATVMs. The southernmost FOB serves passengers exiting the station on the western side and newly constructed eastern side. The middle FOB is connected on the western side to a skywalk that leads to Swami Vivekanand Road. Auto-rickshaw services are available on the main entrances or exits on both the sides of the station.

 Platform 1 caters Churchgate bound slow locals (rarely Mumbai CSMT/Panvel locals also available) (trains originate and terminate here) 
 Platform 2 caters Mumbai CSMT/ Panvel bound slow locals (rarely Churchgate locals also available) (trains originate and terminate here) 
 Platform 3 caters Virar/Borivali bound slow and semi-fast locals (slow from Andheri) 
 Platform 4 caters Churchgate bound slow and semi-fast locals (fast from Andheri) 
 Platform 5 caters Virar/Borivali bound semi-fast locals (slow from Andheri)
 Platform 6 caters Churchgate bound semi-fast locals (fast from Andheri)
 Platform 7 caters Churchgate bound fast locals originating from Goregaon (in the morning)

Bus Services
On either side of the station BEST has a bus station. The Goregaon depot operates most of the bus routes on the western side of the station (some services are rarely supplied through Oshiwara Depot also) while Dindoshi depot operates most of the eastern side of the station (Bus Route 341 is an exception which is operated by Pratiksha Nagar Depot when it is transported through and from Antop Hill). The Western side of bus services caters bus services from the station to the western areas of Goregaon along with Chincholi area of Malad and farther western areas in Jogeshwari and Andheri. Bus services on the east serves the areas of Dindoshi, Yashodham, Gokuldham and residential hubs nearby Aarey Colony.

References

Railway stations opened in 1867
Railway stations in Mumbai Suburban district
Mumbai Suburban Railway stations
Mumbai WR railway division